William Smyth (fl. 1465 – died 1490) was an English gothic architect responsible for the work including the fan vaults at Wells Cathedral, Sherborne Abbey and Milton Abbey. He may also have been the architect of the Church of St Bartholomew, Crewkerne.

References

Gothic architects
15th-century births
1490 deaths
15th-century English architects